Oravská Poruba is a village and municipality in Dolný Kubín District in the Zilina Region of northern Slovakia. It stands at 487 m (1598 ft) and has a population of 1089.

References

External links
    Oravská Poruba Village website (in Slovak)

Villages and municipalities in Dolný Kubín District